The 2014 Havant Borough Council election took place on 22 May 2014 to elect members of Havant Borough Council in Hampshire, England. One third of the council was up for election and the Conservative Party stayed in overall control of the council.

After the election, the composition of the council was:
Conservative 31
Labour 4
UK Independence Party 2
Liberal Democrats 1

Background
Before the election Tony Briggs announced his resignation as leader of the council and the Conservative group on the council. Mike Cheshire was chosen in April 2014 by the Conservatives as their new leader, defeating 3 other candidates.

14 seats were contested at the election with the Conservatives, Labour and Liberal Democrats standing for every seat, while the Green party stood in 8 seats and the UK Independence Party (UKIP) stood in 6 seats. The composition of the council before the election was 34 Conservatives, 3 Labour and 1 Liberal Democrat councillors.

On 19 May 2014 candidates from the 5 parties standing at the election held a debate with parking, and especially the increase in parking charges in 2013, being a major issue.

Election result
The Conservatives lost 3 seats, 2 to UKIP and 1 to Labour, but still won 10 of the 14 seats contested. This reduced the Conservatives to 31 of the 38 seats on the council, Labour went up to 4 seats, UKIP won their first 2 seats, while the Liberal Democrats remained on 1 seat. Overall turnout at the election was 32.8%, up from 27.5% at the 2012 election.

The UKIP gains from the Conservatives came in Hayling East, where John Perry took the seat after a recount, and in Stakes ward, where Gary Kerrin won by 34 votes after the Conservative councillor Olwyn Kennedy stood down at the election. Meanwhile, in the only other change Labour's Beryl Francis gained Warren Park from the Conservatives, after Mark Johnson did not stand for re-election. Among those to hold their seats were the leader of the Conservatives Mike Cheshire in Hart Plain ward and the only Liberal Democrat councillor Faith Ponsonby in Battins.

Ward results

Barncroft

Battins

Bedhampton

Bondfields

Cowplain

Emsworth

Hart Plain

Hayling East

Hayling West

Purbrook

St. Faiths

Stakes

Warren Park

Waterloo

References

2014 English local elections
Havant Borough Council elections
2010s in Hampshire